Route 49 is a state route in the U.S. state of Massachusetts. Known as Podunk Pike, the highway runs  from U.S. Route 20 (US 20) in Sturbridge north to Route 9 in Spencer. Route 49 provides a connection between US 20 and Route 9 in southwestern Worcester County.

Route description

Route 49 begins at US 20 (Charlton Road) in the town of Sturbridge. Route 49 crosses over Interstate 90 (Massachusetts Turnpike) with no interchange as it clips the northwest corner of the town of Charlton. The highway parallels Podunk Road for most of its course as it passes to the east of Wells State Park and enters the town of East Brookfield. Route 49 enters the town of Spencer, crosses over CSX's Boston Subdivision rail line, and crosses over the Sevenmile River  before it reaches its northern terminus at Route 9 (Main Street).

Major Intersections

References

049
Transportation in Worcester County, Massachusetts